The Beggar Countess is a 1918 German silent film directed by Joe May and Bruno Ziener and starring Mia May, Heinrich Peer, and Johannes Riemann.

Cast
Mia May as Ulla Dulters
Heinrich Peer as Henryk van Deuwen
Käthe Wittenberg as Stella van Deuwen
Hermann Picha
Hermann Seldeneck
Theodor Burghard
Johannes Riemann

References

External links

Films of the Weimar Republic
German silent feature films
Films directed by Joe May
Films directed by Bruno Ziener
UFA GmbH films
German black-and-white films
1910s German films